Moon Over Broadway is a 1997 documentary film starring Carol Burnett and directed by Chris Hegedus and D. A. Pennebaker.

Overview
The film documents the play Moon Over Buffalo from rehearsal period through the Broadway opening.

Cast
 Philip Bosco as himself
 Carol Burnett as herself
 Jane Connell as herself
 Randy Graff as herself
 Ken Ludwig as himself
 Bob Mackie as himself
 Kate Miller as herself
 Tom Moore as himself (Director)
 Andy Taylor as himself

References

External links

American documentary films
1997 films
1997 documentary films
Documentary films about Broadway theatre
Films directed by D. A. Pennebaker
1990s English-language films
1990s American films